Cheshire West and Chester is a unitary authority with borough status in the ceremonial county of Cheshire, England. It was established on 1 April 2009 as part of the 2009 local government changes, by virtue of an order under the Local Government and Public Involvement in Health Act 2007. It superseded the boroughs of Ellesmere Port and Neston, Vale Royal and the City of Chester; its council assumed the functions and responsibilities of the former Cheshire County Council within its area. The remainder of ceremonial Cheshire is composed of Cheshire East, Halton and Warrington.

The decision to create the Cheshire West and Chester unitary authority was announced on 25 July 2007 following a consultation period, in which a proposal to create a single Cheshire unitary authority was rejected.

Governance

In line with every other district in Cheshire, the cabinet (formerly 'the executive' between 2009 and 2015) is composed of elected councillors. From its establishment in 2009, Cheshire West and Chester was governed by the Conservative Party, with Mike Jones as leader. Since the 2015 elections it has been governed by the Labour Party, with Samantha Dixon becoming the first female leader of the council upon taking office.

The leader presently oversees a cabinet of eight, with each member holding a specific portfolio. Opposition parties can also elect to appoint shadow cabinet members, though they have no executive power.

All councillors vote to appoint a chairman for the following municipal year (May) at the council AGM. Traditionally, this role was combined with that of the apolitical and ceremonial Lord Mayor of Chester, but in 2015 these roles were separated and the role of chairman was politicised.

The cabinet is scrutinised by one general committee and four district committees made up of councillors, which replaced six dedicated scrutiny committees for different topics in May 2015.

Elections

The first elections to the authority took place on 1 May 2008, with the electoral wards being the same as those used in the former Cheshire County Council elections, each ward electing three councillors. There were twenty-four wards in total, meaning that seventy-two councillors were elected.

An electoral review by the Local Government Boundary Commission for England was put into effect prior to the 2011 elections, meaning that three additional councillors were created, making a total of seventy-five in the borough. The ward boundaries were also comprehensively re-drawn, with their number being increased by twenty-two to forty-six. The new wards were mostly single-member wards, with two and three-member wards for the more populous areas.

The 2015 election took place on 7 May, producing the first change of executive in the council's history.

Subdivisions
The borough is divided into forty-six wards, listed below in alphabetical order.

There are ninety-seven parish councils in the borough, despite there being a total of 166 civil parishes before a community governance review was undertaken by the borough council in 2014 under section 82 of the Local Government and Public Involvement in Health Act 2007.

Notes

Members of Parliament

Current MPs are highlighted in bold.

Notes

Demography

Ethnicity

In line with nearly every local government district in England and Wales, the majority of the population describe themselves as 'white'. The exact figure - 95.3% - is comparable with metropolitan counties such as Merseyside, non-metropolitan counties such as Cumbria and principal areas throughout Wales. This would suggest that the figure is not a significant outlier nationwide.

The next largest ethnic group in the borough is Asian, who along with other ethnic minorities are supported by the Cheshire Asian & Minority Communities Council, a registered charity headquartered in Chester.

Nationality

The majority of the population of Cheshire West and Chester is British-born, with the percentage standing at 95.1% (2011), a figure significantly above that of the UK as a whole (88.7%, 2010). The largest overseas nationality is Polish, which is significant because of the World War II U.S. military base and subsequent Polish refugee camp in Cuddington.

Religion

The overwhelming main religion in Cheshire West and Chester is Christianity, with a percentage figure above the average for England and Wales (59.3%, 2011). The single largest church is the Church of England, with the borough being served by the Chester Archdeaconry, with six deaneries and an average of twenty parish churches in each deanery. Roman Catholicism also has a significant presence across the borough, with all its churches located in the Diocese of Shrewsbury.

Methodist churches in the borough form groups averaging ten, known as 'circuits' (the four in Cheshire West and Chester are all part of the Chester and Stoke-on-Trent District). More marginal churches include Assemblies of God, Baptist Union, Elim Pentecostal, United Reformed and the English Presbyterian Church of Wales in Chester.

Aside from churches, there are two mosques in Cheshire West and Chester - one each in Chester and Ellesmere Port - which were subjected to property theft and racially aggravated disorder respectively in 2014.

Local nature reserves
Cheshire West and Chester Council maintains six Local Nature Reserves: Burton Mill Wood, Helsby Quarry, Marshall's Arm, Rivacre Valley, Stanney Wood, and Whitby Park.

Transport

Air
There are no passenger airports in the borough (a grass airfield exists in Little Budworth), with the nearest being Liverpool and Manchester which licensed vehicles provide transport to. Airbus' fleet of A300-600ST Beluga transporter aircraft are based at Hawarden Airport in neighbouring Flintshire, adjacent to their wing manufacturing facility.

Cycling
National routes which pass through the borough include NCR5, NCR45 (Mercian Way), NCR56, NCR562, NCR563, NCR568 and NCR573. Regional routes include 70 (Cheshire Cycleway) and 71.

Three disused railways in the borough have been converted to off-road cycleways, including:
Birkenhead Railway: Contains sections of NCR56 and the Wirral Circular Trail and is now called Wirral Way.
Chester & Connah's Quay Railway: Contains a section of NCR5 and is now called Chester Millennium Greenway.
Winsford and Over Branch Line: Contains a section of regional route 71 and is now called Whitegate Way.

The Shropshire Union Canal towpath between Waverton and the National Waterways Museum is paved with asphalt and is a shared-use route between cyclists and pedestrians, for a distance of 12.5 miles. Between Tarvin Bridge and Blacon Avenue, it is also lit.

In 2009, Chester was awarded the status of 'Cycling Town' by Cycling England. To reflect this, a series of colour-coded signposted routes around the city were devised in 2012. The total length of new signposted routes created by the project was thirty-eight miles, bringing the overall total in the borough to 312.5. The total funding received from the cycling town project, which ended in 2011 when Cycling England was disbanded, was £4.4 million. A similar network of over thirty miles of cycle routes branded the Ellesmere Port Grenway has been proposed by the town's development board.

Park and Ride
Chester has four park and ride sites located adjacent to radial routes on the city's outskirts (Boughton Heath, Sealand Road, Upton and Wrexham Road) running on two lines which intersect at Chester Bus Interchange. A fifth site is proposed near Hoole Village.

Hooton station is designated as a park and ride facility for railway services on the Wirral Line, it contains a 418-space car park.

Rail

Chester is the hub of the railway network in the borough, with around 4.7 million passengers annually. Passenger numbers doubled to this figure in the ten years to 2015, making the station the eighth-busiest in North West England. Railway lines (and their associated franchise(s)) in the borough - not necessarily connecting to Chester - include:
Borderlands Line (Wales & Borders): Connects Bidston in Wirral with Wrexham in Wales and includes a stop at Neston. Services are provided by Transport for Wales.
Chester-Manchester Line (Wales & Borders): Includes stops at Helsby and Frodsham and is operated by Transport for Wales.
Ellesmere Port to Warrington Line (Northern): Includes stops at Stanlow & Thornton and Ince & Elton before meeting the Chester-Manchester Line near Helsby and is operated by Northern according to a Department for Transport-set minimum service pattern.
Halton Curve (Wales and Borders): Connects Chester - Liverpool includes stops at Chester, Helsby, Frodsham, Runcorn, Liverpool South Parkway and Liverpool Line Street and is operated by Transport for Wales.
Mid-Cheshire Line (Northern): Leaves the Chester-Manchester Line near Mickle Trafford and includes stops at Mouldsworth, Delamere, Cuddington, Greenbank, Northwich and Lostock Gralam, with services provided by Northern. A single-track railway exists between Northwich and Sandbach, but it is only used for freight.
North Wales Coast Line (InterCity West Coast and Wales & Borders): Originates at Crewe and passes through Chester, with services provided by Transport for Wales and Avanti West Coast.
Shrewsbury to Chester Line (InterCity West Coast and Wales & Borders): The section between Wrexham and Chester is currently in the process of being reinstated as a two-track railway under the direction of the Welsh Government. Services are provided by Transport for Wales and Avanti West Coast.
West Coast Main Line (InterCity West Coast): Aside from stops at Winsford, Hartford and Acton Bridge, the branch line to Liverpool Lime Street diverges at Weaver Junction - the oldest of its type in Great Britain. It is currently operated by Avanti West Coast, however High Speed 2 services to Liverpool using "classic compatible" trains are proposed to run along this section of the line.
Wirral Line (Merseyrail): Chester is one of the terminus stations of the line which loops clockwise around Liverpool city centre in a tunnel. The line includes stops at Bache, Capenhurst and Hooton, with a branch line from the latter running to another terminus at Ellesmere Port, with stops at Little Sutton and Overpool. The line is operated by Merseyrail with this line and the WCML being the only two electrified railways in the borough.

Current and proposed improvements
The sections of railway between Chester - Stockport and Chester - Warrington Bank Quay are proposed for electrification during the period 2019–2024.

The Crewe North Rolling Stock Depot serving High Speed Two is proposed to be built in the civil parish of Stanthorne and Wimboldsley. The line itself enters the borough in that location and leaves it again near the A556/A559 junction at Lostock Gralam.

Road

Motorways and primary routes in the borough which are maintained by Highways England (trunk roads de jure) include the M6, M53, M56, A55, A483, A494, A550 and a short section of the A41 in Hooton. Other primary routes which are maintained by the council (principal roads de jure) include the A41, A49, A51, A54, A56, A483, A530, A533, A534, A556, A5115, A5116, A5117 and A5268.

Chester and Ellesmere Port - both primary route destinations - form the hub of the road network in Cheshire West and Chester, with routes of national importance carrying traffic in all directions to locations including Flintshire, Halton, Wirral and Wrexham.

European Route E05 is routed via the M6, carrying international traffic between Scotland, North West England, the West Midlands and France via Southampton. European route E22 is routed via the A494 and M56, carrying international traffic between Ireland (the route in fact begins at the Port of Holyhead), North Wales, North West England, Yorkshire and the Netherlands. Both routes meet at Lymm Interchange, which lies in neighbouring Cheshire East.

Three Roman roads exist in Cheshire West and Chester, Two originating in Chester (Deva Victrix) and running to Northwich (Condate) and Whitchurch (Mediolanum) respectively.
The Roman road of kings street in Northwich which runs from Middlewich to Warrington.

The section of the A51 between its western terminus and the B5132 was named as one of the most congested roads in the United Kingdom by INRIX in August 2015.

Three local MPs - Graham Evans, Justin Madders and Chris Matheson - raised safety concerns about the M56 between J12 and J14 in parliament after more than one hundred-and-sixty incidents were recorded since 2011. In response, Andrew Jones, the Parliamentary Under Secretary of State for Transport, confirmed that an upgrade to smart motorway will only take place after 2020.

Water
Navigable waterways in the borough include the Manchester Ship Canal, Shropshire Union Canal, Trent and Mersey Canal and the Weaver Navigation, the latter two being connected together by the Anderton Boat Lift near Northwich, the only caisson lift lock in the United Kingdom.

Places of interest

Tourist attractions

Sport

Football

Chester FC are the highest ranked club in the area and compete in the National League North (the sixth tier of English football. Northwich has four semi-professional teams - Barnton, Northwich Victoria, Witton Albion and 1874 Northwich - all of whom play in regional leagues. Winsford is also represented in the non-league pyramid by Winsford United, and Ellesmere Port by Vauxhall Motors FC – the former works team of the Vauxhall Ellesmere Port assembly plant. 

Below level ten of the English pyramid are county-wide amateur leagues, with two covering the geographic area of the borough - the Cheshire Association Football League and West Cheshire Association Football League. Although several clubs are members of the former, many more compete in the latter. Below that is the Chester & Wirral Football League, and also the Mid-Cheshire district leagues who cater for the areas of knutsford, Northwich, Middlewich and Winsford where teams representing neighbourhoods/villages and/or pubs/social clubs ('pub teams') compete.

The largest football stadium in Cheshire West and Chester is the Deva Stadium, home to Chester FC, although the ground famously straddles the England-Wales border.

Twin towns
Whilst the borough per se does not have any twinning agreements, several of its settlements have agreements predating its creation in 2009, listed below:

See also 

Cheshire County Council
Cheshire East Council
Chester City Council

References

External links
 Cheshire West and Chester Council website
 Webcasts – Cheshire West and Chester Council meetings

 
Cheshire and Warrington Local Enterprise Partnership
Districts of Cheshire
English unitary authorities created in 2009
Unitary authority districts of England
Boroughs in England